Local elections will be held in  Santa Maria, Bulacan on May 13, 2019 within the Philippine general election in 2019 Bulacan local elections. The voters will elect for the elective local posts in the municipality: the mayor, vice mayor, and eight councilors.

Mayoralty Election

Mayor
Incumbent mayor Russel Pleyto is running for his 2nd term, his opponents are former mayors Bartolome Ramos and Ato Mateo.

Vice Mayor
Incumbent vice mayor Ricky Buenaventura is running for his 2nd term, his opponent is incumbent councilor Nelson Luciano.

Sangguniang Bayan election

Election is via plurality-at-large voting: A voter votes for up to eight candidates, then the eight candidates with the highest number of votes are elected.

Councilors Nelson Luciano, Oscar Morales and Obet Perez are term-limited, while incumbent  Froilan Caguiat is term-limited and running for Board Member in the Fourth district. Councilors Rogelio Barcial, Jun Mateo and Marissa Tuazon will run for their second terms, while Jay de Guzman, will run for his third and final term.

|-bgcolor=black
|colspan=25|

References

2019 Philippine local elections
Elections in Bulacan
May 2019 events in the Philippines
2019 elections in Central Luzon